Lieutenant-General David Leslie Judd CB (born 1950) is a former Quartermaster-General to the Forces.

Military career 
David Judd was commissioned into the Royal Electrical and Mechanical Engineers in 1970. In 2000, he was appointed Director-General Equipment Support (Land) as well as Quartermaster-General to the Forces. Then in 2003 he became General Officer Commanding 4th Division. His final posting was as Deputy Commander-in-Chief Regional Headquarters Allied Forces North in 2004. He retired in 2007.

He was also Colonel Commandant of the Royal Electrical and Mechanical Engineers.

References 

 

|-

British Army lieutenant generals
Companions of the Order of the Bath
Royal Electrical and Mechanical Engineers officers
Living people
1950 births
People from Colchester
Military personnel from Colchester